Karley Sciortino is an American writer, television host, and producer. She is the founder of Slutever, a website that focuses on sex and sexuality, and executive producer and host of the Viceland documentary series of the same name. She also writes Vogue online sex and relationships column, Breathless.

Career

Slutever 
Sciortino started her blog Slutever in 2007 while living in London. Initially, the blog centered around her and roommates' sexual exploits and life in their squatting commune, but soon evolved into what The New York Times called "a chronicle of sexual experimentation."

In 2012, Sciortino and producer Adri Murguia started a web series called Slutever for Vice, which ran for three seasons. The series took a journalistic approach to exploring taboo aspects of modern sexuality, with Sciortino as host. In 2017, Sciortino and Murguia co-created a Viceland television series, also called Slutever, which built thematically off the webseries. The second season of Viceland's Slutever aired in 2019.

Sciortino's memoir Slutever: Dispatches from an Autonomous Woman in a Post Shame World was published by Grand Central Publishing (New York City) on February 6, 2018.

Now Apocalypse 
Sciortino and Gregg Araki co-wrote the first season of Now Apocalypse (executive produced by Steven Soderbergh), a surreal comedy television show premiering on Starz in 2019. Sciortino is also the show's consulting producer. The series was cancelled after one season.

Easy 
In 2017, Sciortino starred in "Side Hustle," Episode 3 of Season 2 of Joe Swanberg's Netflix television show Easy.

Personal life
Sciortino was born in Highland, Ulster County, New York. She was raised Catholic in an Italian-American family in upstate New York. She later moved to London where she lived in a squatting commune. In 2010, Sciortino moved to New York City, and she currently lives between New York and Los Angeles.

She has dated both men and women.

References

External links

 Slutever Blog
Slutever Viceland Show

Year of birth missing (living people)
American feminists
American sex columnists
American women columnists
American people of Italian descent
Educators from New York (state)
American women educators
Living people
People from Highland, Ulster County, New York
Sex-positive feminists
Television personalities from New York (state)
Vogue (magazine) people
LGBT women
American LGBT writers
21st-century American women